Francesco Bellini,  (born November 20, 1947) is an Italian-born research scientist, administrator, entrepreneur and Quebecer business man.

A pioneer scientist-entrepreneur for Canadian bio-pharmaceutical industry, he was co-founder of Biochem Pharma, as well as chairman and chief executive officer from 1986 to 2001. He has authored or co-authored more than twenty-five patents over his 20-year career as a research scientist.

Youth and schooling
Born in 1947 in Ascoli Piceno, Italy, Bellini immigrated to Canada in 1967.  He received his Bachelor of Science degree from Loyola College (now Concordia University) in 1972 and his Doctor of Philosophy specializing in organic chemistry from the University of New Brunswick in 1977.  He is the author and co-author of some 30 patents and has published numerous articles and papers based on his research.

Professional biography 
Bellini is chairman of Picchio International, a privately owned company investing mainly in the fields of healthcare. Bellini also serves as chairman of Klox Technologies – a privately owned company currently developing innovative and highly effective therapeutic and cosmetic solutions for use in the fields of dentistry, dermatology and tissue repair; BELLUS Health – a publicly traded company focusing on developing drugs for rare diseases; and FB Health – a privately owned company involved in the research, development and commercialization of innovative molecules for the prevention and treatment of diseases in the Psychiatric, Neurologic and Geriatric fields.

Until 2001, Bellini was chairman of BioChem Pharma, an industry leader in HIV and a biopharmaceutical company focused on infectious diseases and cancer, which he co-founded in 1986. BioChem discovered the antiviral drug Epivir (3TC), which to this day is the cornerstone for AIDS therapy. From 1968 to 1984, he worked as a researcher at the Canadian subsidiary of a multinational pharmaceutical company. In 1984, Bellini established the Biochemicals Division of the Institut Armand-Frappier at the Université du Québec, specializing in research, manufacturing and the commercialization of fine chemicals which in 1986 became BioChem Pharma and in 2001 was successively acquired by Shire plc for $6 billion.

In 2003, he created a state-of-the-art winery, designed to generate the least amount of visual and ecological impact on the environment. Domodimonti is a boutique winery located on the countryside of Montefiore dell'Aso in Le Marche, Italy.

Prior to this, Bellini was chairman of ViroChem Pharma, which was acquired by Vertex Pharmaceuticals in 2009. Between 1997 and June 2014, Bellini served as a director on the board of Molson Coors Brewing Company.

Bellini is also a member of the following boards of directors:  Montreal Heart Institute Foundation and Italian Chamber of Commerce.

Sport
On 3 February 2014, Bellini refounded Ascoli Picchio F.C. 1898, and three days later the new club acquired all the rights of the bankrupted Ascoli Calcio 1898, the historical football team of Bellini's hometown.

Philanthropy
He donated $10 M towards a new life sciences building at McGill University. He made a major donation toward a new residence and centre for people with Alzheimer's.

Special honor
For his major contribution in the fields of entrepreneurship, research and economy, Bellini received the title of "Cavaliere del Lavoro", the most prestigious honor granted by the Italian Republic. Over the years, Bellini has received the following awards.

On 1 February 2016 he received a PhD honoris causa in Pharmaceutical Science from "La Sapienza University" of Rome.

Awards 
1987 – Successors: Second Annual Celebration of Canada's Unsung Business Heroes Canadian Business Magazine
1991 – Man of the Month Revue Commerce (Commerce Magazine)
1992 – Premio Award (Business Category) Canadian Italian Business and Professional Association
1993 – Ernest A. Le Sueur Memorial Lecturer Award Society of Chemical Industry of Canada
1994 – Prix Industrie 1994 « Association de la recherché industrielle du Québec » (Industrial Research Association of Quebec)
1995 – Personality of the Year Canadian Italian Business and Professional Association
1995 – The Golden Lion « Ordine Figli d'Italia » (Order of the Sons of Italy)
1996 – Italian Entrepreneurs Around The World Yesterday and Today – Canada: New Frontiers in Pharmacology « 5 Imprenditori Italiani nel mondo ieri eoggi, Milan: Libri Scheiwiller, 1996. Canada: Le nuove frontiere della farmacologia di Dott. Francesco Bellini »
1996 – Award of Distinction Concordia University Faculty of Commerce and Administration – Montreal, Canada
1997 – Imprenditore dell’anno-Premio International Ernst & Young « Camera di Commercio di Milano di Unioncamere »
1997 – Onorificenza Di Grande Ufficiale, Government of Italy
1998 – Quebec's Top 50 Revue Commerce (Commerce Magazine)
1998 – Lauréat de la réussite (Magazine Entreprendre)
1998 – Honorary Degree Doctorate of Science from University of New Brunswick – New Brunswick, Canada
1998 – Honorary Degree Doctorate of Science from University of Ottawa – Ottawa, Canada
1998 – National Merit from Ottawa Life Sciences Council
1999 – Member of Great Montrealers « Académie des Grands Montréalais »
1999 – Les Bâtisseurs de 1950 à 1999 Revue Commerce   (Commerce Magazine)
2000 – Member of C.P.Q.'s Entrepreneurs Club « Conseil du Patronat du Quebec »
2000 – Officer Order of Canada
2001 – Member of Excelia Club BioQuebec
2002 – Queen's Golden Jubilee Medal
2002 – Personality of the Week La Presse2002 – Honorary Degree Doctorate of Laws from Concordia University – Montreal, Canada
2003 – Personality of the Year, Business Category, Cyberpresse La Presse2004 – Honorary Degree Doctorate of Science from McGill University – Montreal, Canada
2004 – Officer National Order of Quebec
2005 – Honorary Degree Doctorate of Laws from Queen's University – Ontario, Canada
2005 – Cavaliere del Lavoro Italian Government (Italian orders of merit)
2006 – Picchio D'Oro
2010 – Honorary Degree Doctorate of Science from McMaster University – Ontario, Canada
2012 – Honorary Degree Doctorate of Science from University of Camerino – Le Marche, Italy
2013 – Queen's Diamond Jubilee Medal
2014 – President of Ascoli Picchio F.C. 1898
2016 – PhD honoris causa'' in Pharmaceutical Science from "La Sapienza University" of Rome.

References

External links
 Klox Technologies
 BELLUS Health
 FB Health
 Molson Coors Brewing Company

Businesspeople from Montreal
Scientists from Montreal
Officers of the Order of Canada
Officers of the National Order of Quebec
1947 births
Living people
People from Ascoli Piceno
Italian emigrants to Canada
University of New Brunswick alumni
Loyola College (Montreal) alumni
Canadian pharmacologists
Italian pharmacologists